= Cellular textile =

Type of modern textile

Cellular textiles is an alternative way of producing textiles that is very different than both knitting and weaving. Cellular textiles are a "reinforced composite with evenly distributed cell size has the characteristics of light weight, high impact strength, and ... to be used as energy..."

== Production ==
Cellular Textiles, produced using additive manufacturing, are defined by their complex interlocking parts. A single base unit geometry is created, with variable parts. By repeating these base units over a surface while changing their parts, textiles with varying properties can be created.
